Mysore Lok Sabha Constituency  is one of the 28 Lok Sabha constituencies in Karnataka.

Assembly segments
Presently, Mysore Lok Sabha constituency comprises the following eight legislative assembly segments:

Madikeri and Virajpet Legislative Assembly segments were earlier in the erstwhile Dakshina Kannada (Mangalore) Lok Sabha constituency.  They were later added up to Mysore Lok sabha Constituency during Delimitation process in 2007 by Delimitation Commission of India, which came into existence during 2009 Indian general election.

Members of Parliament

Election results

General Election 1962

General Election 1967

General Election 1971

General Election 1977

General Election 1980

General Election 1984

General Election 1989

General Election 1991

General Election 1996

General Election 1998

General Election 1999

General Election 2004

General Election 2009

General Election 2014

General Election 2019

See also
 Coorg Lok Sabha constituency
 Mysore district
 Kodagu district
 List of Constituencies of the Lok Sabha

References

External links
Mysore lok sabha  constituency election 2019 date and schedule

Lok Sabha constituencies in Karnataka
Mysore district